Keith Raymond "Huffer" Christiansen (July 14, 1944 – November 5, 2018) was a professional ice hockey player who appeared in 138 World Hockey Association (WHA) regular season games with the Minnesota Fighting Saints between 1972 and 1974. Before turning professional, he was a member of the United States' 1972 Winter Olympics team that won the silver medal and also represented the United States at the 1969, 1970 and 1971 Ice Hockey World Championships.

Christiansen was born in Fort Frances, Ontario, Canada. He played hockey in high school for International Falls, Minnesota then went to University of Minnesota Duluth where he was captain of the hockey team. He is one of the more famed UMD Bulldogs; Christensen is in the UMD Hall of Fame and has his number 9, hung in Amsoil Arena where the Bulldogs currently play. He also played with the Waterloo Black Hawks and Grand Rapids Bruins of the United States Hockey League as an amateur.

He was inducted into the United States Hockey Hall of Fame in 2005. Christiansen died in 2018 at the age of 74 from lung cancer.

Awards and honours

References

External links
 
 Keith "Huffer" Christiansen at United States Hockey Hall of Fame
 

1944 births
2018 deaths
American men's ice hockey centers
Canadian emigrants to the United States
Deaths from cancer in Minnesota
Deaths from lung cancer
Ice hockey people from Ontario
Ice hockey players at the 1972 Winter Olympics
Medalists at the 1972 Winter Olympics
Minnesota Fighting Saints players
Minnesota Duluth Bulldogs men's ice hockey players
Olympic silver medalists for the United States in ice hockey
Sportspeople from Fort Frances
United States Hockey Hall of Fame inductees
AHCA Division I men's ice hockey All-Americans